A dual role (also known as a double role) refers to one actor playing two roles in a single production. Dual roles (or a larger number of roles for an actor) may be deliberately written into a script, or may instead be a choice made during production, often due to a low budget. In film and television, dual roles are often used for comic effect, or to depict identical twins or relatives. In a theatrical production where more than one actor plays multiple characters, it is sometimes referred to as an "Ironman" cast.

Theatre
In theatre, the use of multiple roles may be budget-related, may be intended to give an accomplished actor more stage time or a greater challenge, or may be of thematic significance to the story. The combination of factors leading to such a decision may often remain unknown. For example, debate exists over the significance of William Shakespeare's use of dual roles, with a notable example being whether the characters of Cordelia and the Fool in King Lear were intended to be one and the same, or whether the mysterious Third Murderer in Macbeth is actually Macbeth himself.

In the works of absurdists such as Tom Stoppard, characters played by the same actor are often of thematic significance.

In the musical Hamilton, four actors/actresses are cast in dual roles, each a major supporting character, with a change of roles between the first and second acts. The actors who play John Laurens/Philip Hamilton, Lafayette/Thomas Jefferson, and Hercules Mulligan/James Madison wear identical white costumes in the opening song, "Alexander Hamilton", and were given lines with intentional double meanings that would fit either of their dual roles.

Film

Lee Marvin won an Academy Award for Best Actor for a dual role in Cat Ballou (1965). Nicolas Cage was nominated for Best Actor for a dual role in Adaptation (2002). Peter Sellers was nominated for Best Actor for a triple role in Dr. Strangelove (1964). 

In some low-budget films, actors have been cast in more than one role to save money.

Multiple casting has often included the casting of an actor as multiple members of the same family.

Starting in the 1970s, having a living double in a Bollywood film became "almost a genre in itself," according to filmmaker Govind Nihalani. In Ram Aur Shyam, Dilip Kumar acted as two brothers who got separated immediately after their birth. Seeta Aur Geeta uses a female version of this plot device in which Hema Malini acted as two separated sisters.  In Enthiran (2010), at the time the most expensive Indian film ever made, Rajinikanth plays a dual role covering the two main characters, a scientist and the humanoid robot he created.

Television
In television, soap operas have commonly used the technique to either portray twins (or even similar looking relatives), or to bring back an actor whose character has been killed.  As an example, Denise Crosby's character, Tasha Yar is killed off in the first season of Star Trek: The Next Generation and another character was created to bring back Crosby in the third season.

References

Acting